Pentti Salo (born 14 October 1941) is a Finnish wrestler. He competed in the men's Greco-Roman 78 kg at the 1968 Summer Olympics.

References

External links
 

1941 births
Living people
Finnish male sport wrestlers
Olympic wrestlers of Finland
Wrestlers at the 1968 Summer Olympics
People from Lapua
Sportspeople from South Ostrobothnia